The Tender Years is a 1948 American drama film directed by Harold D. Schuster, written by Arnold Belgard, Abem Finkel and Jack Jungmeyer, and starring Joe E. Brown, Richard Lyon, Noreen Nash, Charles Drake, Josephine Hutchinson and James Millican. It was released on January 3, 1948, by 20th Century Fox.

Plot

Cast   
Joe E. Brown as Rev. Will Norris
Richard Lyon as Ted Norris
Noreen Nash as Linda
Charles Drake as Bob Wilson
Josephine Hutchinson as Emily Norris
James Millican as Kit Barton
Griff Barnett as Sen. Cooper
Jeanne Gail as Jeanie
Harry Cheshire as Sheriff Fred Ackley 
Blayney Lewis as Frank Barton
Jimmie Dodd as Spike

References

External links 
 

1948 films
1940s English-language films
20th Century Fox films
American drama films
1948 drama films
Films directed by Harold D. Schuster
American black-and-white films
1940s American films